Victoria Harbour is a community in the Canadian province of Nova Scotia, located in Kings County.

Communities in Kings County, Nova Scotia
General Service Areas in Nova Scotia